Hoyland is a surname. Notable people with the surname include:

Jamie Hoyland (born 1966), English footballer and manager
John Hoyland (disambiguation), multiple people
Robert G. Hoyland (born 1966), British historian
Tommy Hoyland (born 1932), English footballer
Vic Hoyland (born 1945), English classical composer